Albano is both a given name and a surname. Notable people with the name include:

Given name
Albano Bizzarri (born 1977), Argentine footballer
Albano Carrisi (born 1943), Italian singer with the stage name Albano or Al Bano
Albano Harguindeguy (1927–2012), Argentine army general and Interior Minister
Albano Mucci Australian champion for environmental management and animal conservation and social justice for Australia's indigenous peoples
Albano Pera (born 1950), Italian sports shooter
Albano Narciso Pereira (1922–1990), Portuguese footballer also known simply as Albano
Albano Sehn Neto (born 1997), Brazilian footballer

Surname
Elías Fernández Albano (1845–1910), Chilean politician, briefly acting president of Chile
Francesco Albani or Albano (1578–1660), Italian Baroque painter
Leandro Albano (born 1992), Portuguese footballer
Lou Albano (1933–2009), professional wrestler
Lucia Albano (born 1965), Italian politician
Michael Albano (born 1950), American politician
Miriam Albano (born 1991), Italian opera mezzo-soprano
Nelson Albano (born 1954), American politician
Pablo Albano (born 1967), Argentine retired tennis player
Silvia Albano (born 1994), Italian tennis player
Wendy Albano (died 2012), American woman who was murdered in Bangkok

Italian-language surnames